The 2010 Atlanta Tennis Championships was a men's tennis tournament played on outdoor hard courts. It was the 23rd edition of the event known that year as the Atlanta Tennis Championships and was part of the ATP World Tour 250 series of the 2010 ATP World Tour.  The Atlanta Tennis Championships was the first ATP stop of the 2010 US Open Series. 2010 was the first year this tournament was held in Atlanta. Previously, it had been hosted by Indianapolis. Mardy Fish won the singles title.

ATP entrants

Seeds

*Seedings based on the July 12, 2010 rankings and is subject to change.

Other entrants
The following players received wildcards into the singles main draw
  Andy Roddick
  James Ward
  Donald Young

The following players received entry from the qualifying draw:
  Igor Kunitsyn
  Nick Lindahl
  Gilles Müller
  Ryan Sweeting

Finals

Singles

 Mardy Fish defeated  John Isner, 4–6, 6–4, 7–6(7–4)
 It was Fish's 2nd title of the year and 5th of his career.

Doubles

 Scott Lipsky /  Rajeev Ram defeated  Rohan Bopanna /  Kristof Vliegen, 6–3, 6–7(4–7), [12–10]

References

External links
Official website